Charles Murdoch was a Scottish footballer who played in the Scottish League for St Bernard's as a right half.

Personal life 
Murdoch served in the British Army during the First World War.

Career statistics

References 

Place of death missing
Scottish footballers
Newcastle United F.C. players
Year of birth missing
Year of death missing
Place of birth missing
Association football wing halves
British Army personnel of World War I
St Bernard's F.C. players